John George Bero (December 22, 1922May 11, 1985) was an American professional baseball player, a shortstop who played a total of 65 games in the Major Leagues for the Detroit Tigers and the St. Louis Browns during 1948 and 1951. Bero was a native of Gary, West Virginia, who attended Western Michigan University.

He played 61 games as a shortstop and second baseman for the 1951 Browns, batting .213 with all of his 34 MLB hits. He played his final game with the Browns on July 22 and two days later was traded to the Brooklyn Dodgers. He spent the rest of his career in minor league baseball.

External links

1922 births
1985 deaths
Baseball players from West Virginia
Buffalo Bisons (minor league) players
Burials at Holy Cross Cemetery, Culver City
Detroit Tigers players
Fort Worth Cats players
Major League Baseball second basemen
Major League Baseball shortstops
Oakland Oaks (baseball) players
St. Louis Browns players
Toledo Mud Hens players
Western Michigan Broncos baseball players
Western Michigan Broncos men's basketball players
People from Gary, West Virginia